Mount Albert-Ponsonby is a semi-professional association football club in Mount Albert, Auckland, New Zealand.

History
The club is an amalgamated between Mount Albert FC and Ponsonby in 1971. Ponsonby had previously won the Chatham Cup, New Zealand's premier knockout tournament, in 1927 and 1933.

The club won play-off series to earn a place in the 1971 National Soccer League. The team were briefly known, during their second season in the league, as Auckland City FC after getting support from Eden AFC

Present day
Mount Albert-Ponsonby current home ground is Anderson Park, Mt Albert, Auckland. The team's current kit colours are Blue with a Gold trim for the home kit, and Red for the away kit.

Notes

References

External links
New Zealand 2004/05 Season Results

Association football clubs in Auckland
Association football clubs established in 1931
1931 establishments in New Zealand